USS Parrakeet may refer to one of the following United States Navy ships:

 , coastal minesweeper, placed in service 29 April 1941.
 , the former YMS-434 commissioned 15 November 1944.
 USS Parrakeet (AM–419), an  cancelled 11 August 1945.

References 

United States Navy ship names